Kommunistisk Ungdom Marxister-Leninister (KUML, Communist Youth Marxist–Leninists), was a political youth movement in Denmark. KUML was the youth wing of Kommunistisk Forbund Marxister-Leninister. KUML was founded in 1969, as a split from Socialistisk Ungdoms Forum. KUML was disbanded in 1971, and its members joined KFML.

See also
Communist Union (Marxist–Leninists)

References

1969 establishments in Denmark
1971 disestablishments in Denmark
Youth wings of political parties in Denmark
Youth wings of communist parties